The Club is a baseball reality TV show broadcast on the MLB Network.  In 2010, its first season, the show focuses on the Chicago White Sox.  While many White Sox leaders appear on the show, general manager Kenny Williams and manager Ozzie Guillén appear most frequently.

References

2010s American reality television series
2010 American television series debuts
Chicago White Sox
MLB Network original programming